Popara (Greek: Ποπάρα) is the title of the third studio album by the popular Greek artist Popi Maliotaki, released in 2008 by Alpha Records (Greek company). This album is the third album who released Maliotaki. After the satire of Lakis Lazopoulos to Popi Maliotaki, Maliotaki replied with satirical way through the song with title "Ime I Popara". After the release of this album, Popi Maliotaki had great success and recognise.

Track listing

Trivia
The song "Ime I Popara" Popi Maliotaki sang in 6 different languages and 3 versions.

References

2008 albums
Greek-language albums
Popi Maliotaki albums